Phenatoma zealandica, common name the New Zealand turrid,  is a  species of predatory sea snail, a marine gastropod  mollusc in the family Borsoniidae.

Description
The size of an adult shell varies between 10 mm and 23 mm.

(Original description) The shell has a flesh-white color. The acuminate spire has a dark brown apex. The shell contains 10 whorls. The first two are polished, vitreous and convex. The others are rather convex, keeled above and flattened sloping downwards. The large body whorl  is somewhat inflated and contracted towards the base. It contains about 12 strong furrows, longitudinally striated. The dark aperture is ample. The oblique columella is brownish, curved in the middle. The short siphonal canal is slightly curved.

This species is remarkable for the tabulated whorls, the tabulations being very strongly radiately striated, and sometimes furnished with a spiral liration, and the conspicuous sulcations encircling the body whorl. The slit in the lip is situated just below the broad furrow which grooves the upper part of the whorls.

Distribution
This marine species is endemic to New Zealand.

References 

 Spencer H.G., Willan R.C., Marshall B.A. & Murray T.J. (2011). Checklist of the Recent Mollusca Recorded from the New Zealand Exclusive Economic Zone

External links
 
  Bouchet P., Kantor Yu.I., Sysoev A. & Puillandre N. (2011) A new operational classification of the Conoidea. Journal of Molluscan Studies 77: 273-308.

Further reading 
 Powell A. W. B., New Zealand Mollusca, William Collins Publishers Ltd, Auckland, New Zealand 1979 

zealandica
Gastropods of New Zealand